Artema is a genus of cellar spiders that was first described by Charles Athanase Walckenaer in 1837.

Species
 it contains twelve species, found in Africa, Asia, Greece, and Turkey:
Artema atlanta Walckenaer, 1837 (type) – Northern Africa and Middle East. Introduced elsewhere (mainly tropical and subtropical regions)
Artema bahla Huber, 2019 – Oman
Artema bunkpurugu Huber & Kwapong, 2013 – West Africa
Artema dhofar Huber, 2019 – Oman
Artema doriae (Thorell, 1881) – Turkey, Israel, United Arab Emirates, Iran, Afghanistan. Introduced: Japan
Artema ghubrat Huber, 2019 – Oman
Artema kochi Kulczyński, 1901 – Eritrea, Ethiopia, Sudan, Yemen, Egypt?
Artema magna Roewer, 1960 – Afghanistan, Pakistan?
Artema martensi Huber, 2021 – Morocco
Artema nephilit Aharon, Huber & Gavish-Regev, 2017 – Greece, Turkey, Cyprus, Israel, Jordan, Yemen?, United Arab Emirates?
Artema transcaspica Spassky, 1934 – Tajikistan, Turkmenistan, Uzbekistan
Artema ziaretana (Roewer, 1960) – Afghanistan

See also
 List of Pholcidae species

References

Araneomorphae genera
Pholcidae
Spiders of Africa
Spiders of Asia
Taxa named by Charles Athanase Walckenaer